Aerospace Testing Alliance (ATA) is a defunct aerospace engineering company in the United States of America. It was the prime contractor of the US Air Force's Arnold Engineering Development Center (AEDC), in Tullahoma, Tennessee from 2003 until 2016.

Launched in 2003, ATA was a joint operation of Jacobs Sverdrup, General Physics, Computer Sciences Corporation (CSC), DynCorp. ATA was contracted at $2.7 Billion for a 12-year period.

The Center is now operated by National Aerospace Solutions

External links 
company site
US Air Force's AEDC Fact sheet regarding ATA
Jacobs-Sverdrup ATA announcement
CSC ATA announcement
Nashville Business Journal

Aerospace companies of the United States